Hanli Rolfes (born 5 April 1971) is a South African actress and writer. She is best known for her roles in the series Getroud met rugby, Kruispad and Generations.

Personal life
Rolfes was born on 5 April 1971. In 1994, she graduated with an Honors degree in Drama from the University of Pretoria.

She married Deon Opperman, a fellow actor and playwright in 2002, until their divorce in 2010.<ref>{{Cite web |date=2015-11-06 |title=Foto's en video: Hond die ster van n Pawpaw vir my darling' se Johannesburgse première |url=https://maroelamedia.co.za/vermaak/flieks/fotos-en-video-hond-die-ster-van-n-pawpaw-vir-my-darling-se-johannesburgse-premiere/ |access-date=2021-10-18 |website=Maroela Media |language=en}}</ref>

Career
In 1995, Rolfes made her television debut in Die Laksman as Lieutenant Bernice Fox. In 1996, she joined the cast of the SABC1 soap opera Generations as Sarah-Lee Odendaal, a role she would play for six years until 2001. After that, she appeared in a number of kykNET series such as Villa Rosa as Louise Schoeman, Kruispad as Sophie Landman, and Binnelanders as Sonja Mostert. In 2009, she co-created the soapie Getroud Met Rugby with her husband Deon Opperman and played the supporting character Lanie.

In 2010s, she appeared in series such as Justice For All, The Adventures of Sinbad, Vetkoekpaleis, Egoli, Iemand om lief te hê, Jozi Streets, 4Play: Sex Tips for Girls, Askies!, Soul City, Skeem Saam, Hartland and Geraamtes in die Kas. Apart from television, she performed in some stage plays such as Boesman my Seun (2005), Twaalfuurwals (2006), Kaburu (2007) and Knypie Oppie Kant (2008). In 2008, she joined with SABC2 game show Where Were You? as one of the contestant panelists. In 2012, she made her film debut with a small role in Sleeper's Wake. In 2016, she joined the SABC2 soap opera 7de Laan  asAnna van Biljon. Even though she left the role in 2016, she continued to work on 7de Laan'' as a scriptwriter.

Filmography

References

External links

Living people
South African film actresses
1971 births
South African screenwriters